The Lola Horag HSB, also known as the Lola Horag VAG Can-Am Turbo, or simply as the Lola Horag, was a sports prototype race car, originally designed and built by Lola, as the open-wheel Lola T88/50 Formula 3000 race car, for the International Formula 3000 Championship in 1988, but later further developed into a sports prototype race car, for the European-based Interserie championship, in 1991.

References

Can-Am cars
Sports prototypes
Lola racing cars
Mid-engined cars
1990s cars